Ludmila Nelidina (born 7 December 1984) is a Russian former competitive figure skater. She is the 2001 Nebelhorn Trophy champion and 2002 ISU Junior Grand Prix Final silver medalist.

Career 
Nelidina competed for Russia until 1998, when she briefly switched to competing for Azerbaijan. She switched back to skating for Russia the following year. Her highest placement at a senior-level ISU Championship was 13th at the 2003 World Championships. During her career, she was coached by Tatiana Pomerantseva, Zhanna Gromova, and Viktor Kudriavtsev.

Nelidina landed a triple Axel in competition at the 2002 Skate America. Together with Yukari Nakano, who also completed a triple Axel at that competition, Nelidina was the first female skater in 10 years to perform a triple Axel in international competition. She is the first European lady skater to land a triple Axel in competition, the other skaters having been from Japan and the United States.

After retiring from competition, Nelidina began coaching in Moscow. She is currently on the faculty of coaches giving private skating lessons at the Wheaton Ice Arena in Maryland.

Programs

Competitive highlights

References

External links
 

1984 births
Living people
Figure skaters from Moscow
Russian female single skaters
Azerbaijani female single skaters